Bistorta vacciniifolia, the whortleberry-leaved knotweed, is a species of flowering plant in the family Polygonaceae, native to Tibet and the Himalaya. Well-suited for clay soils, as its synonym Persicaria vacciniifolia it has gained the Royal Horticultural Society's Award of Garden Merit.

References

vacciniifolia
Flora of East Himalaya
Flora of Nepal
Flora of West Himalaya
Flora of Tibet
Plants described in 1904